Clodius is an alternate form of the Roman nomen Claudius, a patrician gens that was traditionally regarded as Sabine in origin. The alternation of o and au is characteristic of the Sabine dialect. The feminine form is Clodia.

Republican era

Publius Clodius Pulcher

During the Late Republic, the spelling Clodius is most prominently associated with Publius Clodius Pulcher, a popularis politician who gave up his patrician status through an order in order to qualify for the office of tribune of the plebs. Clodius positioned himself as a champion of the urban plebs, supporting free grain for the poor and the right of association in guilds (collegia); because of this individual's ideology, Clodius has often been taken as a more "plebeian" spelling and a gesture of political solidarity. Clodius's two elder brothers, the Appius Claudius Pulcher who was consul in 54 BC and the C. Claudius Pulcher who was praetor in 56 BC, conducted more conventional political careers and are referred to in contemporary sources with the traditional spelling.

The view that Clodius represents a plebeian or politicized form has been questioned by Clodius's chief modern-era biographer. In The Patrician Tribune, W. Jeffrey Tatum points out that the spelling is also associated with Clodius's sisters and that "the political explanation … is almost certainly wrong." A plebeian branch of the gens, the Claudii Marcelli, retained the supposedly patrician spelling, while there is some inscriptional evidence that the -o- form may also have been used on occasion by close male relatives of the "patrician tribune" Clodius. Tatum argues that the use of -o- by the "chic" Clodia was a fashionable affectation, and that Clodius, whose perhaps inordinately loving relationship with his sister was the subject of much gossip and insinuation, was imitating his stylish sibling. The linguistic variation of o for au was characteristic of the Umbrian language, of which Sabine was a branch. Forms using o were considered archaic or rustic in the 50s BC, and the use of Clodius would have been either a whimsical gesture of pastoral fantasy, or a trendy assertion of antiquarian authenticity.

Other Clodii of the Republic
In addition to Clodius, Clodii from the Republican era include:

 Gnaeus Cornelius Lentulus Clodianus, presumably a "Clodius" before his adoption
 Clodius Aesopus, a tragic actor in the 50s BC who may have been a freedman of one of the Clodii Pulchri.
 Claudia, daughter of Clodius Pulcher and Fulvia, the first wife of emperor Augustus.
 Clodia, sister of Publius Clodius Pulcher, sometimes identified in Catullus' poems as "Lesbia".

Women of the Claudii Marcelli branch were often called "Clodia" in the late Republic.

Imperial era

People using the name Clodius during the period of the Roman Empire include:
 Gaius Clodius Licinus, consul suffectus in AD 4.
 Gaius Clodius Vestalis, possible builder of the Via Clodia
 Publius Clodius Thrasea Paetus, senator and philosopher during the reign of Nero
 Lucius Clodius Macer, a legatus who revolted against Nero
 Publius Clodius Quirinalis, from Arelate in Gaul, teacher of rhetoric in time of Nero
 Decimus Clodius Septimius Albinus, commonly known as Clodius Albinus, rival emperor 196-197
 Marcus Clodius Pupienus Maximus, known as Pupienus, co-emperor 238
 Titus Clodius Pupienus Pulcher Maximus,  son of emperor Pupienus and suffect consul c. 235

Clodii Celsini
The Clodii Celsini continued to practice the traditional religions of antiquity in the face of Christian hegemony through at least the 4th century, when Clodius Celsinus Adelphius (see below) converted. Members of this branch include:
 Quintus Fabius Clodius Agrippianus Celsinus, proconsul of Caria in 249 and the son of Clodius Celsinus (b. ca. 185); see for other members of the family.
 Clodius Celsinus Adelphius, praefectus urbi in 351.
 Quintus Clodius Hermogenianus Olybrius, consul 379

See also
 Clodio the Longhair, a chieftain of the Salian Franks, sometimes called "Clodius I"
Leges Clodiae, legislation sponsored by Clodius Pulcher as tribune

References

Selected bibliography

Tatum, W. Jeffrey. The Patrician Tribune: P. Clodius Pulcher. Studies in the History of Greece and Rome series. University of North Carolina Press, 1999. Limited preview online. Hardcover .

Further reading

 Fezzi, L. Il tribuno Clodio. Roma-Bari, Laterza, 2008. .

Ancient Roman prosopographical lists
Ancient Roman names